Gynacantha manderica is a species of dragonfly in the family Aeshnidae. It is found in Burundi, the Democratic Republic of the Congo, Ivory Coast, Ghana, Guinea, Kenya, Liberia, Malawi, Namibia, Nigeria, Sierra Leone, Somalia, South Africa, Sudan, Tanzania, Uganda, Zambia, and Zimbabwe. Its natural habitats are subtropical or tropical moist lowland forests, subtropical or tropical moist shrubland, and shrub-dominated wetlands.

References

Aeshnidae
Insects described in 1902
Taxonomy articles created by Polbot